Epiphanius (served 612–613) was the first Patriarch of Aquileia to rule from Grado.

References
Acland, Arthur Herbert Dyke "Epiphanius." Def. 24. A Dictionary of Christian Biography, Literature, Sects and Doctrines, Vol. II. Ed. Henry Wace. Published 1880. Accessed 9 Feb. 2008 Google Books preview.

Patriarchs of Aquileia
7th-century Italian bishops
612 births
613 deaths
Year of birth unknown
Year of death unknown